2MASS J22282889–4310262 is a brown dwarf discovered by the Hubble Space Telescope and The Spitzer Space Telescope in 2013. Using Hubble and Spitzer, NASA astronomers were able to develop the most detailed 'weather map' for brown dwarfs, utilizing different wavelengths of infrared light to show changing light patterns and different layers of material in the windstorms (the layers were generated because water and methane vapors are visible at different infrared wavelengths). This observation was the first time that researchers were able to probe such variability at different altitudes of a brown dwarf. In the outer layers of its atmosphere, gases condense into raindrop-like particles made up of sand and iron which fall into the interior. 

Researchers also determined that the object's temperature ranges from 1,100 to 1,300 degrees Fahrenheit (600 to 700 degrees Celsius). The brown dwarf is rotating extremely rapidly, with 1.41 hours rotation period being the smallest reliably measured rotation period of brown dwarf as at 2021.

References

Astronomical objects discovered in 2013
Brown dwarfs
J22282889–4310262
Grus (constellation)
T-type stars